Ylikiiminki is a former municipality of Finland. It was consolidated with the city of Oulu on 1 January 2009.

It was located in the province of Oulu and is part of the Northern Ostrobothnia region. The municipality was unilingually Finnish.

Neighbouring municipalities were Haukipudas, Kiiminki, Muhos, Oulu, Pudasjärvi, Utajärvi and Yli-Ii. Oulujoki municipality, closed in 1965, was also a neighbouring municipality.

References

External links 

 Municipality of Ylikiiminki – official site

Former municipalities of Finland
Ylikiiminki
Populated places established in 1867
Populated places disestablished in 2009
2009 disestablishments in Finland